Jorge Daniel Álvarez Rodas (born 28 January 1998) is a Honduran professional footballer who plays as a defensive midfielder for Olimpia.

International career

International goals
Scores and results list Honduras' goal tally first.

Honours
Honduras Youth
 Pan American Silver Medal: 2019

References

External links

1998 births
Living people
Honduran footballers
Honduras international footballers
Association football midfielders
Sportspeople from Tegucigalpa
C.D. Olimpia players
2019 CONCACAF Gold Cup players
Pan American Games medalists in football
Pan American Games silver medalists for Honduras
Footballers at the 2019 Pan American Games
Medalists at the 2019 Pan American Games
Footballers at the 2020 Summer Olympics
Olympic footballers of Honduras